Razdolny is a rural locality (a khutor) in Kamennoyarsky Selsoviet, Chernoyarsky District, Astrakhan Oblast, Russia. The population was 12 as of 2010.

Geography 
Razdolny is located on the Volga River, 67 km northwest of Chyorny Yar (the district's administrative centre) by road. Kamenny Yar is the nearest rural locality.

References 

Rural localities in Chernoyarsky District